Nemea is a genus of moths of the family Thyrididae from Africa.

Species
Some species of this genus are:

Nemea ankole 	Whalley, 1971
Nemea betousalis 	(Gaede, 1917)
Nemea eugrapha 	(Hampson, 1906)
Nemea nivosa 	Whalley, 1971
Nemea tamsi 	Whalley, 1971

References

Thyrididae
Moth genera